Arnica lessingii is a Russian and North American species of arnica in the sunflower family. The common name is nodding arnica. It is found on both sides of the Bering Strait, being native to Alaska, Yukon, British Columbia, Northwest Territories, and the Kamchatka Peninsula of the Pacific Coast of Russia.

References

lessingii
Flora of Subarctic America
Flora of the Russian Far East